American punk rock band Dead Kennedys has released four studio albums, one extended play, three live albums, and four compilations.

Albums

Studio albums

Live albums

Compilation albums

EPs

Singles

Music videos
 "Holiday in Cambodia"
 "Forest Fire"
 "California Über Alles"
 "Kill the Poor"

Videos

Other appearances 
The following Dead Kennedys tracks were released on compilations. This is not an exhaustive list; tracks that were first released on the band's albums, EPs, or singles are not included.

I Denotes tracks that were re-released on Give Me Convenience or Give Me Death.

References
General

Specific

Punk rock group discographies
Discographies of American artists